Typhoon Studios Inc. was a Canadian video game developer based in Montreal. It was founded by Alex Hutchinson, Yassine Riahi, and Reid Schneider in early 2017 and acquired by Google in December 2019, becoming part of Stadia Games and Entertainment (SG&E). After releasing its first game, Journey to the Savage Planet, in 2020, Typhoon Studios was shut down alongside SG&E in February 2021.

History 
Alex Hutchinson, Yassine Riahi, and Reid Schneider founded Typhoon Studios in Montreal in February 2017. They had previously worked for development studios of Ubisoft, Electronic Arts, and Warner Bros. Interactive Entertainment (WBIE), among others. They felt as though it only made sense to start a company if the founding team was composed of a creative director, a production person, and a technical director. Hutchinson stated that the company sought to occupy a near-extinct middle market of "mid-sized games" (such as Firewatch and Hellblade: Senua's Sacrifice) between indie games and big-budget AAA games. He specifically cited a lack of budget to create a game like those in the Call of Duty series. Hutchinson announced Typhoon Studios' formation in April 2017.

Early on, the company received funding from the Chinese venture capital firm Makers Fund, although this did not translate into an increased focus on the Asian video game market. Typhoon Studios' first hire was the art director Erick Bilodeau, who had worked with the founders at WBIE. The first office was established in a motion capture studio for which the company did not have to pay rent, fit with IKEA desks and second-hand furniture from Craigslist. After occupying another temporary office in a basement, the studio received sufficient funding to move into its first proper office. By September 2018, Typhoon Studios had signed a long-term partnership with 505 Games, which would see the publisher release Typhoon Studios' debut game. The studio had 20 employees at this time and grew to 25 by December of that year. During The Game Awards in December 2018, the company announced its debut game as Journey to the Savage Planet.

On December 19, 2019, Google acquired Typhoon Studios and placed it under Stadia Games and Entertainment (SG&E), the division developing games exclusively for Stadia, Google's cloud gaming service. The studio was integrated with SG&E's existing Montreal studio, which was headed up by Sébastien Puel. Jade Raymond, the head of SG&E, stated that the purchase was driven by the expertise of the Typhoon Studios team, citing multiple AAA games previously shipped by the individual members. Journey to the Savage Planet was not part of the acquisition. The game was released for PlayStation 4, Windows, and Xbox One in January 2020, followed by a Nintendo Switch port in May of that year. A Stadia version was released on February 1, 2021. On the same day, Google announced the closure of SG&E and its studios, with the former Typhoon Studios team leaving the company. Several of the former staffers—including Hutchinson, Schneider, Bilodeau, Yannick Simard, and Marc-Antoine Lussier—founded the studio Raccoon Logic in August 2021 with initial funding from Tencent and other investors. They negotiated with Google to maintain control of the Journey intellectual property, including the work Typhoon Studios had completed on a planned sequel.

References

External links 
 

2017 establishments in Quebec
2019 mergers and acquisitions
2021 disestablishments in Quebec
Canadian companies disestablished in 2021
Canadian companies established in 2017
Companies based in Montreal
Defunct companies of Quebec
Defunct video game companies of Canada
Google acquisitions
Video game companies disestablished in 2021
Video game companies established in 2017
Video game development companies